Klinar is a Slovenian surname. Notable people with the surname include:

 Andrej Klinar (1942–2011), Slovenian alpine skier
 Anja Klinar (born 1988), Slovenian swimmer
 Denis Klinar (born 1992), Slovenian footballer

Slovene-language surnames